Hell Bound is a 1931 American pre-Code drama film directed by Walter Lang.

Plot
A racketeer marries a singer who knows about his operation so that she cannot be compelled to testify against him in court.

Cast
 Leo Carrillo as Nick Cotrelli
 Lloyd Hughes as Dr. Robert Sanford
 Ralph Ince as Dorgan
 Lola Lane as Platinum Reed
 Helene Chadwick as Sanford's Sister
 Richard Tucker as Gilbert
 Gertrude Astor as Rosie
 Frank Hagney as Hood
 Harry Strang as Gaspipe

References

External links
 

1931 films
1931 drama films
American drama films
American black-and-white films
Films directed by Walter Lang
1930s English-language films
1930s American films